Three Days (of Hamlet) is a documentary film by Alex Hyde-White that follows his effort to produce a staged reading of William Shakespeare's Hamlet at the Matrix Theatre in West Hollywood, California during three days in July 2010.

Cast
The cast includes Hyde-White (Hamlet), Richard Chamberlain (Polonius), Stefanie Powers (Gertrude), Tom Badal (Claudius), Peter Woodward (Laertes/Player King) and Joseph Culp (Himself) Mara New (Producer)

Synopsis
The film builds on its main structure of on-stage happenings by juxtaposing stories from the players. Hyde-White weaves his own personal dramatic narrative about "Fathers and Sons" as he recalls stories from his childhood as the son of the well-known British actor Wilfrid Hyde-White. At times, particularly when the character of Hamlet experiences the visitations from his father's ghost, King Hamlet, the line of what is theatre and what is real life is purposely deconstructed, and what happens onstage is commented on offstage, to achieve a self-reflective dynamic.

Reception
The film received generally negative reviews.

References

Sources

External links
Official website

2012 documentary films
American documentary films
Documentary films about theatre
Films set in Los Angeles
Works about Hamlet
2012 films
2010s American films